Geoff Leek (18 February 1932 – 21 February 2008) was an Australian rules footballer who played with Essendon in the VFL from 1951 to 1962.

First senior match 
Recruited from the Preston Boys Club (he had been released by Collingwood to whom he was residentially bound), he played in Essendon's Thirds (under-19s), and played something like four seasons with the Seconds before becoming a regular seniors player in 1953.

He was selected as a reserve for his first senior game for Essendon. It was against Richmond at Windy Hill on Saturday 7 July 1951. Essendon won by four points: 10.14 (74) to Richmond's 10.10 (70).

He took a long time to develop, playing only six senior matches in 1951, and five in 1952.

He played in the highly talented 1952 Essendon Seconds Premiership team that beat Collingwood Seconds 7.14 (56) to 4.5 (29). All but one of the premiership team's 20 players had either already played for the Essendon Firsts or would go on to do so in the future; the team was:

Excluding the senior games that some had already played (or would go on to play) with other VFL clubs, the members of the Essendon 1952 Seconds Premiership Team played an aggregate total of 1072 senior games for Essendon Firsts.

Career 
He eventually went on to play 191 senior games for Essendon (including 70 consecutive games between 1956 and 1960), and score 98 goals in his senior career.

Although possessed of great speed across the ground, Leek was an ungainly ruckman with great tenacity and enormous physical strength and, despite his atrocious kicking in front of goals (he was a left-foot kick, capable of kicking long distances, but was rarely accurate), he became a regular in the Essendon senior sides of the 1950s.

He was a beautiful palmer of the ball; and towards the end of his career, as Leek's skills and knowledge of ruck play developed, and he learned how to cooperate with ruck-rover Hugh Mitchell, and as he took over the responsibilities of the first ruck from John Gill, the club's fortunes began to rise as a real force.

He was selected in the Victorian representative team that played four matches in the Australian National Football Council's (ANFC) Centenary Carnival held in Melbourne in 1958.

VFL's tallest player 
In May 1952, as part of its promotion of the Burt Lancaster movie Ten Tall Men, the management of the Melbourne cinema The State Theatre on the corner of Flinders Street and Russell Street (now known as the Forum Theatre) measured the height of the ten tallest VFL players.

Geoff Leek was officially declared to be the tallest: at 6'4½" he was half an inch taller than the next 8 tallest players, Denis Cordner of Melbourne, Kevin Easton of North Melbourne, John Gill of Essendon, Brian Gilmore of Footscray, Jack "Chooka" Howell of Carlton, Tom H. McLean of Melbourne, Bill McMaster of Geelong, and George Swarbrick of Geelong (all of whom were 6'4"), and an inch taller than Colin Thornton of North Melbourne, who was 6'3½".

Renowned for his courage and dedication as a player, his fine character as a man, and his overall good sportsmanship, he was known throughout the football world as "the gentle giant".

1962 Grand Final 
Having played in two losing grand finals (1957 Grand Final Team and 1959 Grand Final Team) Leek was finally in a winning team, the 1962 VFL Grand Final Team against Carlton. This was his last game for Essendon. He completely nullified Carlton's John Nicholls, and paved the way for Essendon's victory.

He almost didn't play at all due to an ankle injury – he was in doubt even half an hour before the match – and he took to the field having had a series of pain killing injections. According to Maplestone (1996, p. 193):

In 2008, team-mate Barry Capuano revealed the full story:

Essendon Football Club 
Leek surprised all at Essendon when he announced his retirement prior to the 1963 season.

He had served on the Essendon Football Club's committee in 1957; and was made a Life Member in 1960.

He was the permanent vice-captain of the senior team from 1957 to 1962, and was acting captain on thirteen occasions (four in 1957, two in 1959, one in 1960, five in 1961, and one in 1962).

Post-football media 
He was a highly respected and well loved radio broadcaster over many years, as well as being a panellist on Channel 9's Sunday Football Show (1963–1972), and on the ABC in a similar role (1973–1987). He also served as a member of the VFL Complaints Committee.

Death 
He died suddenly, at home, on Wednesday 21 February 2008, having just celebrated his 76th birthday on the preceding Monday (18 February 2008).

Notes

References 
 Maplestone, M., Flying Higher: History of the Essendon Football Club 1872–1996, Essendon Football Club, (Melbourne), 1996. 
 Miller, W., Petraitis, V. & Jeremiah, V., The Great John Coleman, Nivar Press, (Cheltenham), 1997. 
 Ross, J. (ed), 100 Years of Australian Football 1897–1996: The Complete Story of the AFL, All the Big Stories, All the Great Pictures, All the Champions, Every AFL Season Reported, Viking, (Ringwood), 1996.

External links

Boyles Football Photos: Geoff Leek.
Mike Sheahan: "'Gentle giant' Geoff Leek dies" (Herald Sun, 22 February 2008)
Tim Lane: "Master Bomber was also terrific bloke" (The Age, 23 February 2008)

1932 births
2008 deaths
Australian rules footballers from Victoria (Australia)
Essendon Football Club players
Essendon Football Club Premiership players
Australian rules football commentators
Australian television personalities
Australian radio personalities
One-time VFL/AFL Premiership players